Yaiba: Ninja Gaiden Z is an action adventure hack and slash game, and a spin-off of the Ninja Gaiden franchise. It was published by Tecmo Koei and developed by Spark Unlimited. Comcept's Keiji Inafune produced the game, providing character designs and creating the character of Yaiba. The game was released for the PlayStation 3, Xbox 360, and Microsoft Windows worldwide in March 2014.

Gameplay

Yaiba: Ninja Gaiden Z is a third-person hack and slash video game that features elements similar to previous titles in the series. Players can run, jump, block and attack enemies using Yaiba's blade. A score multiplier on the right-hand of the screen accumulates the player's hit-count on the enemy. The "Ultimate Technique" mode seen in other titles has been replaced by a mode called "Bloodlust" which, when activated, allows Yaiba to destroy multiple enemies around him in quick succession.

Plot
The game follows the exploits of the powerful ninja Yaiba Kamikaze. Yaiba was once part of a clan that tested the abilities of its ninja by putting them up against a highly skilled member; in this case it was Yaiba they had to face. However, after growing weary of his work, Yaiba eventually decides to massacre his own clan and leave the survivors to their deaths. At one point he meets with the franchise mainstay Ryu Hayabusa and decides to challenge him, claiming that he is the weakest foe Yaiba has encountered thus far. During the battle he discovers otherwise as Ryu slices Yaiba's left arm and eye, killing him.

Later, Yaiba is discovered by a mysterious organization known as Forge Industries, led by Alrico del Gonzo, brings him back to life and restores his lost body parts with mechanized duplicates, thus turning him into a cyborg, with a female scientist named Miss Monday as his navigator. Yaiba learns that a zombie outbreak has begun and that Ryu has been searching for the source of the infection. He decides to work with the Forge Industries that resurrected him in order to exact his revenge against Ryu, agreeing to help put a stop to the spread of zombie infection.

Upon finally encountering Hayabusa again one last time, and managing to defeat him, Yaiba finds out that Forge Industries has been manipulating every event, such as unleashing the zombie outbreaks and using him as a tool and self-destruct bomb to kill him and Hayabusa to further the organization's plan. Yaiba decides instead to sacrifice himself to destroy the bomb and spare Hayabusa's life in order for him to save his disciple, Momiji. Upon his revival by Miss Monday for the second time, she too defects Forge Industries due to Del Gonzo's attitudes and manipulative nature, having unleashed the zombies for his own purposes of seeking immortality.

Once Yaiba landed in an abandoned, yet zombie infested Forge Industries building, Yaiba finds a portal to what appears to be an Aztec-themed alternate dimension and found the real Del Gonzo, who seems to be in a dying state inside a tube. Though unable to stop Del Gonzo from transforming into the embodiment of the Aztec god of the underworld, Yaiba manages to find a weak spot to make him mortal again. While Del Gonzo tries to escape from Yaiba's wrath, Miss Monday appears in person and kills Del Gonzo for good. With the portal to the real world closing, Yaiba and Miss Monday barely escape. In the end, Yaiba and Miss Monday decide sell the data of curing zombification. Unknown to them, Hayabusa is observing them.

Development
Yaiba: Ninja Gaiden Z was unveiled on September 19, 2012. It was revealed that, along with Team Ninja, Keiji Inafune would be involved as the director of this new Ninja Gaiden title. On June 6, a new trailer appeared on GT.TV that featured a full motion video sequence, along with a short snippet of real-time gameplay. On October 8, it was announced that Ninja Gaiden Z would be released on Microsoft Windows through the Steam platform. This would make it the first time that a Ninja Gaiden title was released on the platform in the history of the franchise.

Canadian comic book artist James Stokoe has created several art pieces for the game, displaying them at the New York Comic Con. The game is also complemented by a tie-in webcomic, published by Dark Horse Comics. It was drafted by writers Tim Seeley and Josh Eamons, and illustrated by Rafael Ortiz. The comic was released as a free download on Dark Horse's website on January 23, 2014.  The first issue, part one of three, is available to download free on Dark Horse's site.

On December 13, 2013, it was announced that Beck from Mighty No. 9 would become a bonus playable character in Ninja Gaiden Z in the form of downloadable content. This was a deal struck between Comcept and Tecmo Koei, as Keiji Inafune is spearheading both titles.

Release

Reception

Yaiba: Ninja Gaiden Z opened up to mixed reception. The PS3 version received a 43/100 rating on Metacritic, while the Xbox 360 port was awarded a 50/100. Most of the criticism was focused on the repetitive gameplay, the difficulty and the level design. It was included among the 100 worst games of all time by GamesRadar in 2014.

Notes

References

External links

2014 video games
Hack and slash games
Ninja Gaiden games
Video games about ninja
Team Ninja games
Koei Tecmo games
PlayStation 3 games
Unreal Engine games
Video game spin-offs
Video games adapted into comics
Video games scored by Grant Kirkhope
Video games developed in Japan
Video games developed in the United States
Video games featuring female protagonists 
Video games set in the 21st century
Video games with cel-shaded animation
Windows games
Xbox 360 games
Video games about zombies